Novo Goražde (lit. "New Goražde") is a municipality located in Republika Srpska, an entity of Bosnia and Herzegovina. Its center is the village of Kopači. As of 2013, it has a population of 3,117 inhabitants.

History
Goražde was mentioned in 1379 as a trade center and city settlement, with a connection to the Dubrovnik caravan trade, and as an open city in 1444. The medieval fortress Samobor built by Stjepan Vukčić Kosača located in the municipality. Duke of Saint Sava Stjepan Vukčić built the Church of St. George located in Donja Sopotnica. 

In the period from 1519 to 1521, the Goražde printing house functioned in Novo Goražde, making it the second oldest in the Balkans.

The East Bosnian railway from Sarajevo to Uvac and Vardište was built through Ustiprača during Austro-Hungarian rule. The name of the railway station was Ustiprača-Goražde at that time. Construction of the line started in 1903. It was completed in 1906, using the  track gauge. With the cost of 75 million gold crowns, which approximately translates to 450 thousand gold crowns per kilometer, it was one of the most expensive railways in the world built by that time. The extensions were built from Uvac to Priboj, and from Vardište to Belgrade in 1928. In 1939, the railway station Ustiprača became a junction railway station to destinations of Sarajevo, Belgrade and Foča, after a branch line from Ustiprača to Foča had been built. The entire line was closed down in 1978, and dismantled afterwards.

In 1994, the municipality was created by dividing of the pre-existing municipality of Goražde between Republika Srpska and Federation of Bosnia and Herzegovina by the Dayton Agreement. The original name of the municipality was Srpsko Goražde ("Serbian Goražde"), but in 2004 the name was declared unconstitutional and was temporarily changed to Ustiprača. The current name was adopted one year later, in 2005.

Demographics

Population by settlement

Ethnic composition

References

Sources

 

 
Populated places in Novo Goražde
Cities and towns in Republika Srpska